Macarthur Football Club is an Australian professional association football club based in Macarthur, Sydney. The club was formed in 2017 as Macarthur South West United before it was shortly renamed to Macarthur FC in 2019. They were admitted into the A-League Men in 2020, having spent the 2018–19 season playing their one friendly game.

History
When the Macarthur FC bid for the A-League Men was founded in 2017 as Macarthur South West United, they played their first match against Central Coast Mariners in October 2018. Two months later, they successfully won the bid for the expansion for 2019–20 A-League season. Their inaugural season had the team finish 6th to finish in the semi-finals.

Key
Key to league competitions:

 A-League Men (A-League) – Australia's top football league, established in 2005.

Key to colours and symbols:

Key to league record:
 Season = The year and article of the season
 Pos = Final position
 Pld = Matches played
 W = Matches won
 D = Matches drawn
 L = Matches lost
 GF = Goals scored
 GA = Goals against
 Pts = Points

Key to cup record:
 En-dash (–) = Macarthur FC did not participate or cup not held
 R1 = First round
 R2 = Second round, etc.
 QF = Quarter-finals
 SF = Semi-finals
 RU = Runners-up
 W = Winners

Seasons

References

External links
 Ultimate A-League
 ALeague Stats.com

Macarthur FC
Macarthur FC seasons
Australian soccer club seasons